The Second Hogan Ministry was the 47th ministry of the Government of Victoria. It was led by the Premier of Victoria, Edmond Hogan, and consisted of members of the Labor Party. The ministry was sworn in on 12 December 1929.

References 

Victoria (Australia) ministries
Australian Labor Party ministries in Victoria (Australia)
Ministries of George V